Simbo is an Oceanic language spoken by about 2,700 people on Simbo, Solomon Islands.

References

Languages of the Solomon Islands
Northwest Solomonic languages